The Actinomycetaceae (often called actinomycetes or mycelial bacteria) are a family of bacteria in the order Actinomycetales that contains the medically important genus Actinomyces. These organisms are closely related to the mycobacteria, but were originally classified as fungi because they were thought to be transitional forms between bacteria and fungi.

Genera
The family Actinomycetaceae comprises the following genera:

 Actinobaculum Lawson et al. 1997
 "Actinomonospora" Castellani et al. 1959
 Actinomyces Harz 1877 (Approved Lists 1980)
 Actinotignum Yassin et al. 2015
 "Ancrocorticia" Xu et al. 2019
 Arcanobacterium Collins et al. 1983
 Boudabousia Nouioui et al. 2018

 Bowdeniella corrig. Nouioui et al. 2018
 Buchananella Nouioui et al. 2018

 Flaviflexus Du et al. 2013
 Fudania Zhu et al. 2019
 Gleimia Nouioui et al. 2018
 Mobiluncus Spiegel and Roberts 1984
 "Neoactinobaculum" Belkacemi et al. 2019

 Pauljensenia Nouioui et al. 2018
 Peptidiphaga Beall et al. 2021
 Schaalia Nouioui et al. 2018
 "Scrofimicrobium" Wylensek et al. 2020
 Trueperella Yassin et al. 2011
 Varibaculum Hall et al. 2003
 Winkia Nouioui et al. 2018

Phylogeny
The currently accepted taxonomy is based on the List of Prokaryotic names with Standing in Nomenclature (LPSN). The phylogeny is based on whole-genome analysis.

Notes

References

External links
https://web.archive.org/web/20070929122155/http://sn2000.taxonomy.nl/Main/Classification/111575.htm

Actinomycetales
Bacteria families